The 2016 Heilbronner Neckarcup was a professional tennis tournament played on clay courts. It was the third edition of the tournament which was part of the 2016 ATP Challenger Tour. It took place in Heilbronn, Germany between 9 and 15 May 2016.

Singles main-draw entrants

Seeds

 1 Rankings are as of May 2, 2016.

Other entrants
The following players received wildcards into the singles main draw:
  Yannick Maden
  Maximilian Marterer
  Florian Mayer
  Janko Tipsarević

The following players received entry from the qualifying draw:
  Andreas Beck
  Kevin Krawietz
  Henri Laaksonen
  Peter Torebko

The following player received entry as a lucky loser:
  Yannik Reuter

Champions

Singles

 Nikoloz Basilashvili def.  Jan-Lennard Struff, 6–4, 7–6(7–3)

Doubles

 Sander Arends /  Tristan-Samuel Weissborn def.  Nikola Mektić /  Antonio Šančić, 6–3, 6–4

External links
Official Website

Heilbronner Neckarcup
Heilbronner Neckarcup
May 2016 sports events in Europe
2016 in German tennis